L'Étonnant Serge Gainsbourg is the third studio album by French musician Serge Gainsbourg, released in 1961.

Critical reception

Dean McFarlane of AllMusic gave the album 4 out of 5 stars, writing: "One of his most intoxicating amalgams of jazz and pop styles, L'Etonnant Serge Gainsbourg comes highly recommended to fans of '60s French pop."

Track listing

Personnel
Credits adapted from liner notes.

 Serge Gainsbourg – vocals
 Paul Rovère – double bass
 Christian Garros – drums
 Alain Goraguer – piano, arrangements, conductor
Alain Goraguer et Son Orchestre - orchestra
Barthélémy Rosso - acoustic guitar on "La Chanson de Prévert"
Technical
 Jacques Plait – executive production
Jacques Aubert - photography

References

External links
 
 

1961 albums
Serge Gainsbourg albums
French-language albums
Philips Records albums